Silvana Sciarra (born 24 July 1948) is an Italian jurist and academic. She has been a judge of the Constitutional Court of Italy since 11 November 2014 and serves as its president since 20 September 2022.

Career
Sciarra was born in Trani.  She taught European Labour and Social Law at the European University Institute between 1994 and 2003. She was a professor of labour law at the University of Florence and the University of Siena before being appointed to the Constitutional Court by the Italian Parliament on 6 November 2014. In the parliamentary election she obtained 630 out of a necessary 570 votes. She was sworn in on 11 November 2014.

She is the first woman elected by the Italian Parliament as a Judge of the Constitutional Court. Previously, she was a Harkness Fellow at UCLA and Harvard Law School (1974-1976). She was Fulbright Fellow and Visiting Professor in several Universities, among which Warwick (Leverhulme Professor), Columbia Law School (BNL Professor), Cambridge (where she held the Arthur Goodhart Chair in Legal Science 2006-2007), Stockholm, Lund, University College London. She holds Ph.D. Honoris Causa in Law at the Universities of Stockholm (2006) and Hasselt (2012).

References

1948 births
Living people
Academic staff of the European University Institute
European Union law scholars
Judges of the Constitutional Court of Italy
Labour law scholars
People from Trani
Academic staff of the University of Florence
Academic staff of the University of Siena